Dorothy Duffy (born 1980 in Douglas Bridge, Northern Ireland) is an Irish actress. She is best known for her performance as Rose / Patricia in The Magdalene Sisters.

References

External links 
 
 Agency profile

Living people
Irish film actresses
1980 births